Zebeeba is a monotypic moth genus in the family Erebidae erected by William Forsell Kirby in 1892. Its only species, Zebeeba falsalis, was first described by Gottlieb August Wilhelm Herrich-Schäffer in 1839. It is found in northern Africa, southern Europe, Asia Minor and the Levant.

References

Rivulinae
Monotypic moth genera